Edge Common is a  biological Site of Special Scientific Interest in Gloucestershire, notified in 1974.

The Common is in the Cotswold Area of Outstanding Natural Beauty.

Flora
The site is unimproved Jurassic limestone grassland.  This is the type of grassland which was prevalent in the Cotswolds, and the site represents a good example.  The grasses include Tor Grass, Upright Brome and there are typical calcareous herbs present.  There is an area of Beech woodland, and Birch scrub, with scattered disused quarries.

Invertebrates
It is a noted site for butterflies, particularly the Cotswold blues and the Duke of Burgundy. Grazing regimes are being managed to support this.

References

SSSI Source
 Natural England SSSI information on the citation
 Natural England SSSI information on the Edge Common unit

External links
 Natural England (SSSI information)

Sites of Special Scientific Interest in Gloucestershire
Sites of Special Scientific Interest notified in 1974
Cotswolds